Ngayawung (Ngaiawong) is an extinct language of southern South Australia, spoken by the Ngaiawang, Ngaralti and Nganguruku people.

The name is also spelled Ngaiyau, Aiawung, Aiawong, Iawung, Nggauaiyowangko; other names are Birta, Pitta, Pieta, Peeita and Meru.

References

Lower Murray languages